Symsonia is an unincorporated community and census-designated place (CDP) in Graves County, Kentucky, United States. As of the 2010 census, the population of Symsonia was 615.

Geography
The community is located at the intersection of Kentucky Highways 131 and 348. The intersection contains the community's only four-way stop and only flashing red light.

Demographics

References

Census-designated places in Graves County, Kentucky
Census-designated places in Kentucky